Bruce Graham Charlton is a retired British medical doctor who was Visiting Professor of Theoretical Medicine at the University of Buckingham. Until April 2019, he was Reader in Evolutionary Psychiatry at Newcastle University. Charlton was editor of the controversial and non-peer reviewed journal Medical Hypotheses from 2003 to 2010.

Biography

Charlton graduated with honours from the Newcastle Medical School in Newcastle upon Tyne, took a doctorate at the Medical Research Council Neuroendocrinology group, and did postgraduate training in psychiatry and public health. He has held university lectureships in physiology, anatomy, epidemiology, and psychology; and holds a master's degree in English literature from Durham University in North East England. His thesis, a study of the work of Alasdair Gray, was completed in 1989.

From 2003 to 2010, Charlton was the solo-editor of the journal Medical Hypotheses, published by Elsevier. After HIV/AIDS denier Peter Duesberg published a paper in Medical Hypothesis arguing that “there is as yet no proof that HIV causes AIDS", the journal came under fire for its lack of peer review. The paper was withdrawn from the journal citing concerns over the paper's quality and “that [it] could potentially be damaging to global public health.” Elsevier consequently revamped the journal to introduce peer review, firing Charlton from his position as editor, due to his resistance to these changes.

At October 2012, a worldwide campaign including 198 researchers published a critical paper defending Charlton and the idea of editorial review.

Publications
Charlton has published a number of books, and maintains various blogs.
 with RS Downie, The making of a doctor: medical education in theory and practice (1993)
 Psychiatry and the Human Condition (2000; online copy)
 with  Peter Andras, The Modernization Imperative (2003; online copy) 
 Thought Prison: the fundamental nature of political correctness (2011; online copy)
 Not even trying: the corruption of real science (2012; online copy)
 Addicted to Distraction: Psychological consequences of the modern Mass Media (2014; online copy)
 with Edward Dutton, The Genius Famine: why we need geniuses, why they're dying out, and why we must rescue them  (2016; online copy)

See also
Evolutionary psychiatry
Evolutionary medicine
 Bryan Caplan
 Steve Sailer
 David Pearce

References

External links
Bruce Charlton's Notions

Living people
Year of birth missing (living people)
Academics of the University of Buckingham
Academics of Newcastle University
Medical journal editors
Alumni of Newcastle University
21st-century English medical doctors
British medical researchers
British psychiatrists
Alumni of University College, Durham